Events from the year 1878 in China.

Incumbents
 Guangxu Emperor (4th year)
 Regent: Empress Dowager Cixi

Events 
 Qing reconquest of Xinjiang
 Northern Chinese Famine of 1876–79
 The Great Wall construction Was finalized

Births 
 Chen Qimei, Tongmenghui member
 Tögs-Ochiryn Namnansüren, Mongolian independence leader